Saras (in some cases written variously as Sarras) may refer to:

 Saras, Sudan (sometimes divided into "Saras East" and "West" by its placement along the Nile)
 Saras S.p.A., oil refining company of the Massimo Moratti family
 National Aerospace Laboratories (NAL) Saras
 Saras, Iran
 Saras, Kerman, Iran
 Šarūnas Jasikevičius, Lithuanian basketball player

See also
 Sarras (disambiguation)